Velvet Portraits is an album by producer and musician Terrace Martin, released on April 1, 2016. In December of that year, the album was nominated for a Grammy Award for Best R&B Album.

The album was developed during the production of Kendrick Lamar's critically acclaimed album To Pimp a Butterfly, to which Martin was a major contributor. The closing track, "Mortal Man", is an elaboration of musical elements from Butterfly's closing track of the same name.

The fifth track features a performance by Martin's father and acclaimed jazz drummer Ernest "Curly" Martin.

Track listing
Velvet Portraits – 1:34
Valdez Off Crenshaw (featuring Donny Hathaway) – 4:32
Push (featuring Tone Trezure) – 4:36
With You – 4:09
Curly Martin (featuring Robert Glasper, Thundercat, and Ronald Bruner Jr.) – 7:21
Never Enough (featuring Tiffany Gouche) – 5:33
Turkey Taco (featuring The Emotion & Wayne Vaughn) – 4:02
Patiently Waiting (featuring Uncle Chucc & The Emotion) – 7:01
Tribe Called West (featuring Keyon Harrold) – 2:34
Oakland (featuring Lalah Hathaway) – 4:23
Bromali (featuring Marlon Williams) – 3:38
Think of You (featuring Kamasi Washington and Rose Gold) – 5:48
Reverse (featuring Robert Glasper and Candy West) – 3:07
Mortal Man – 11:46

References

2016 albums
Contemporary R&B albums by American artists
Ropeadope Records albums
Albums produced by Terrace Martin
G-funk albums